25 Scottish Songs (or in full Twenty-five Scottish songs: for voice, mixed chorus, violin, violoncello and piano) (Opus 108) was composed by Ludwig van Beethoven. The work was published in London and Edinburgh in 1818, and in Berlin in 1822. It is the only set among Beethoven's folksong arrangements to be assigned an opus number; the rest are only given WoO numbers.

The names of the songs are:
 "Music, Love and Wine"; "O let me music hear, night and day!" 1817, words by William Smyth, folk song setting
 "Sunset"; "The sun upon the Weirdlaw Hill;" 1818, words by Sir Walter Scott, folk song setting
 "O sweet were the hours;" 1817, words by William Smyth, folk song setting
 "The Maid of Isla"; "O maid of Isla from yon cliff;" 1817, words by Sir Walter Scott, folk song setting
 "The sweetest lad was Jamie;" 1815, words by William Smyth, folk song setting
 "Dim, dim is my eye;" 1815, words by William Brown, folk song setting
 "Bonnie Laddie, Highland Laddie"; "Where got ye that siller moon" 1815, words by James Hogg, folk song setting
 "The lovely lass of Inverness;" 1816, words by Robert Burns, folk song setting
 "Behold, my Love"; "Behold my Love how green the groves;" 1817, words by Robert Burns, folk song setting
 Sympathy; "Why, Julia, say, that pensive mien?" 1815, words by William Smyth, folk song setting
 Oh, Thou Art the Lad of My Heart, Willy; 1815, words by William Smyth, folk song setting, variations on this air: Op 107 #9
 Oh, Had My Fate Been Join'd With Thine; 1816, words by Lord Byron, folk song setting
 Come Fill, Fill, My Good Fellow; 1817, words by William Smyth, folk song setting
 O How Can I Be Blithe; 1816, words by Robert Burns, folk song setting
 O Cruel was My Father; 1816, words by Alexander Ballantyne, folk song setting
 Could This Ill World Have Been Contriv'd; 1816, words by James Hogg, folk song setting
 O Mary at Thy Window Be, 1817; words by Robert Burns, folk song setting
 Enchantress, Farewell; 1818, words by Sir Walter Scott, folk song setting
 O Swiftly Glides the Bonny Boat; 1815, words by Joanna Baillie, folk song setting
 Faithfu' Johnie; "When will you come again;" 1815, words by Anne Grant, folk song setting
 Jeanie's Distress; "By William late offended;" 1817, words by William Smyth, folk song setting
 The Highland Watch; "Old Scotia, wake thy mountain strain;" 1817, words by James Hogg, folk song setting for voice, chorus and piano trio
 The Shepherd's Song; "The gowan glitters on the sward;" 1818, words by Joanna Baillie, folk song setting
 Again, my Lyre, yet once again; 1815, words by William Smyth
 Sally in Our Alley; "Of all the girls that are so smart;" 1817, words by Henry Carey, folk song setting

The names in German are:

References

External links
 Beethoven manuscript: draft for the disposition of the Scottish songs op. 108, Autograph. From the Digital Archives of Beethoven-Haus, Bonn. After the first edition, published in England in 1818, Beethoven prepared a German edition. On this manuscript we see Beethoven's reordering and renumbering of the songs for the German edition, published by Schlesinger in Berlin in 1822.
 - Program notes for a performance of a selection from the Twenty-Five Scottish Songs (Op. 108).

Compositions by Ludwig van Beethoven
Scottish music